Rama Paduka Pattabhishekam (Telugu: రామ పాదుక పట్టాభిషేకం) is a 1932 Indian Telugu-language mythological drama film directed by Sarvottam Badami. Yadavalli Suryanarayana, who was a renowned stage actor played the lead role of Lord Rama in the film. The film also starred C. S. R. Anjaneyulu and Surabhi Kamalabai.

The film was based on a plot from the Ramayana involving Lord Rama's fourteen years exile to the forest and Bharata's coronation of Lord Rama's padukas on the throne as symbolic representation of Rama's rule.

Plot
Lord Rama with Sita and Lakshmana leave the palace at Ayodhya as directed by their father Dasaratha. Kaikeyi, Bharata's mother and Dasaratha's second wife has asked that as a boon of her husband in order to place Bharata, Rama’s step-brother on the throne. Bharata refuses to sit on the throne and goes to the forest to get Rama back. Rama reminds Bharata of his duty and declines to go back as he intends fulfilling his fourteen years of banishment in the forest. Bharata then insists on taking Rama’s padukas (slippers) and returns to Ayodhya. He places Rama's Padukas on the throne, suggesting the rightful king and waits for Rama’s eventual return.

Cast
 Yadavalli Suryanarayana as Rama
 C. S. R. Anjaneyulu 
 Surabhi Kamalabai as Seetha

Production 
Sarvottam Badami was contracted by Sagar Movietone (Sagar Film Company) to direct Rama Paduka Pattabhishekham in Telugu. The success of the film established him as a director. He went on to direct Galava Rishi (Tamil), and Sakunthala in Telugu for Sagar Movietone.

Remakes
The film was remade twice, once in 1945 as Paduka Pattabhishekam directed by Kadaru Nagabhushanam, with C. S. R. Anjaneyulu playing the role of Rama this time. The 1965 Paduka Pattabhishekam was directed by Vasanta Kumara Reddy.

References

External links

1932 films
Indian black-and-white films
Films based on the Ramayana
Hindu mythological films
Indian drama films
1932 drama films
Films directed by Sarvottam Badami
1930s Telugu-language films